Michael Gray (born September 2, 1951) is an American actor, known for his portrayal of Billy Batson in the 1970s TV series Shazam!. From 1972–1973, he appeared as Ronnie Collins in the first season of the NBC sitcom The Brian Keith Show, starring Brian Keith and Shelley Fabares. He also appeared as Marcia's boyfriend Jeff in a 1973 episode of The Brady Bunch. In 2015 and 2019, Gray made a voice appearance as a fictionalized version of himself in four episodes of the animated series Archer.

Personal life
Gray owned a florist shop in West Hollywood, Los Angeles with his wife, Stacy Benon. The store closed in the mid-2000s.

Filmography

References

External links
 
 

1951 births
American male film actors
American male television actors
Living people
Male actors from Chicago
People from Chicago